RNAS Portland was an air station of the Royal Navy from 1917.

The site was first built in 1917 as HMS Sarepta within the confines of Portland Harbour as a seaplane base; the aircraft operating from the base's slipways.

In 1959 it became RNAS Portland (HMS Osprey)

See also 

List of air stations of the Royal Navy

References

S